Susan Lesley Harriott (born 11 December 1947) is a former English international lawn and indoor bowler.

Bowls career
In 2005 she won the triples and fours gold medals at the Atlantic Bowls Championships.

She won a bronze medal in the triples with Amy Monkhouse and Jean Baker at the 2006 Commonwealth Games in Melbourne.

In 2006, she won the Bowler of the Year award after qualifying for the six main events at the Women's National Championships. Harriott was still competing at a high level in 2016 when participating in the county championships for Madeira Bowling Club.

Harriott won the National singles title in 2001 and subsequently won the singles at the British Isles Bowls Championships in 2002.

References

External links
 
 

1947 births
Living people
English female bowls players
Commonwealth Games medallists in lawn bowls
Commonwealth Games bronze medallists for England
Bowls players at the 2006 Commonwealth Games
Medallists at the 2006 Commonwealth Games